Weeratunge Edward Perera MBE (22 June 1898 – 23 September 1982) was a Malaysian Sinhalese educator, businessman and social entrepreneur. He brought some semblance of peace to Teluk Anson (now Teluk Intan, Perak, Malaysia) during its occupation by the Imperial Japanese Army in World War II and the Malayan Emergency that followed. W. E. Perera oversaw the restoration of water, electrical supplies, medical services and governance to Telok Anson after its invasion by Japanese forces following the withdrawal of the British forces to Singapore.

With the surrender of the Japanese and during the tumultuous Malayan emergency that followed, he was responsible in restarting and extending the Anglo Chinese School (ACS), Telok Anson (now Sekolah Kebangsaan Horley Methodist, Teluk Intan) with the help of the returning British administration and local philanthropists. He was the first non Methodist post war principal of  the Anglo Chinese School in Telok Anson and was also responsible in organising the first teachers housing cooperative in Malaya at Telok Anson (now the suburb of Kampong Guru (Teacher's Village), Teluk Intan).

Early life and education

W. E. Perera was born in Telok Anson, Perak, to Weeratunge Charles Perera and his wife, Galgodliynage Marthina Perera. His father a contract railway engineer from Kotahena, Ceylon (now Sri Lanka) settled in Malaya (1880s) after accepting the permanent position as Head Guard of the railway between Teluk Anson and Tapah and later retiring as Chief Inspector, Permanent Ways, of the Malayan Railways. He and his siblings, elder sister Margaret, and younger brothers Samuel, Joseph and Daniel grew up in Seremban, Negri Sembilan where his father was subsequently transferred. W. E. Perera started his education at St. Francis Institution, Malacca and then moved to St. Xavier's Institution, Penang to complete his Junior Cambridge exams. After passing the local government school leaving exams at Standard VII, at the direction of his father, he continued his studies whilst living in Prai, Penang with his parents. He passed his Senior Cambridge Certificate exams on a second try during the height of World War I.

World War I (1914–1918)
The First World War came to Malaya at the battle of Penang on 28 October 1914. As he describes in his memoirs,

During this time W E Perera was a member of the Cadet Corps and through his friend Pertha Singh, befriended all the petty officers of the local guarding regiment frequently meeting with them in "one famous bar in those days known as Kee Kee Hotel", Penang.
Although being in the Commonwealth the sympathies of the locals were with the Germans during the early part of World War I.

After leaving school and short apprenticeships in engineering and surveying, his father arranged for him to join the Government service to apprentice under the Chief Clerk of the Railway Traffic office and later the Lands Office in Teluk Anson. Here, W. E. Perera learnt to buy and sell land, plant rubber and became conversant in the Malay language. He also applied to join the Army in an Anglo-Indian regiment being formed in India with volunteers from Malaya much to the disapproval of his father. However, his departure was delayed and later cancelled when the Armistice was ratified with Germany.
On being transferred to Batu Gajah, he lived in his own quarters, socialised with the local Eurasian community, studied and experimented in  psychology, parapsychology, took up athletics and even music, playing the clarinet in a local band. He passed his clerical examinations and then completed a teaching diploma alongside doing a course in bookkeeping.

Career and marriage

W. E. Perera was employed by the Rev. W. E. Horley as a teacher at the Methodist High School in Telok Anson.  By heeding the sound advice of his mentor Mr W. A. Rabel and friends, he saved enough money to invest in coconut and rubber plantations which he successfully ran whilst continuing his career as a teacher. This gave him financial independence to pursue various social activities like helping organise the Boy Scouts of Lower Perak and the Methodist Youth Fellowship, Telok Intan. In 1922, he created "The Cosmopolitan Club" in Telok Ansen, a multi-racial, secular social club. This gave him the opportunity to interact and befriend influential people from various social and ethnic groups like the Japanese, Chinese, Eurasians, Indians, Europeans, Malays and the Royalty of Teluk Anson.In 1928 after a brief visit to see his mother and sister in Taiping, he met and eventually married Meepaygamay Kankananga Joci Perera (7 March 1908 – 6 January 1994) on 11 January 1929. They had 10  children: Minona, Jothika, Abhay, Wimala, Susimal, Tissa, Kimsuke, Jinamal, Kusala and Jaya in the years 1930 to 1947.

The war years

Japanese invasion of Malaya (1942-1945)
The war arrived to Telok Anson in form of air bombing raids by the Japanese Air Forces. Despite being instructed to leave Teluk Anson by the British district officer, W. E. Perera was one of a few people that boldly came out of hiding to help the unfortunate victims. He was a volunteer in the St Johns Ambulance at that time and months earlier had received training as a Superintendent of a medical unit which he put to good use.

As described in one of his birthday messages:

Throughout the war, Mr W. E. Perera was not affected by the atrocities of the Japanese soldiers or the Communists but he was not immune to other factions which he thought were war opportunists. W. E. Perera slapped an Indian National Army health officer who rebuked him for contributing only 5 Japanese dollars for their movement. This landed W. E. Perera being branded a traitor, arrested and detained in the Kempeitai jail. However, after a few hours, he was released when his friends who worked for the Japanese protested his innocence to the Kempeitai.

During the war, a number of people lived with the family of W. E. Perera at his residence at various times for protection against persecution by the Japanese, Communists and for economic reasons. These included Mr Neoh Ban Soon and family, Mr James Ranatunge and family, Mrs Rosie Shoemarker and family, Mrs Loveridge and six former members of an Auxiliary Armed Force. To purchase food during these years, W. E. Perera sold some of his properties.

W. E Perera saved a number of people from being executed during this period. As witnessed by his eldest son Jothika,

Communist Insurgency (1946–1958)

Life in Telok Anson was still difficult after the surrender of the Japanese at the end of World War II when the Malayan Emergency was declared. In the message given to his family, W. E. Perera relates the following:

When the missionaries arrived and found out what W. E. Perera, a non-Methodist teacher had done for their school, they appointed him Principal of the School.

As principal, he created a new high school with a laboratory for science teaching as an extension of ACS, Teluk Anson by getting his friend Mr V. Kn. Kannappa Chettiar to dispose of a five-acre block of rubber land which he owned adjoining the Raja Muda's Istana for a reasonably low price of $25,000. The school was constructed with donations from the Missionaries, various guilds and associations like the rubber and copra associations, sizeable contributions from Raja Musa the then Raja Muda of Perak, and the Malay Gurus Association for special class-rooms to be named after them.

W.E Perera was the first in Malaya to initiate a housing society for teachers of his school at Teluk Anson from 1953 to 1955. He sought loans, land, got the houses built and created the housing estate named Kampung Guru (Teacher's Village) after refusing to have it named after him. This estate was opened by Governor Mc Gillivray of Teluk Anson.

Not one to rest on his laurels, W. E. Perera refused to accept any offers of honours or awards from the Sultan of Perak for his community service during the war. He also refused the recommendation for an MBE (Member of the Order of the British Empire) award made by the then governor Sir Edward Gent. However, when General Sir Gerald Templer offered it again with the statement "the people have requested that it be bestowed upon you", W. E. Perera could not turn down the honour.

Retirement
Keeping to his desire to retire in Kuala Lumpur, Selangor so that his children could have better work and social opportunities, W. E Perera accepted the position of Principal of the Kishan Dial School, Petaling Jaya from the late Swami Satayanda. He eventually settled in Petaling Jaya, Kuala Lumpur in 1965. Here he delved into the study of Asian philosophy and was involved in the establishment of the Brickfields Buddhist Temple among other social endeavours like volunteering in the schools for the underprivileged. He taught Buddhist philosophy at the local university and regularly had discussions with visiting and resident Theravada Buddhist monks like the Revs. K. Sri Dhammananda, Ananda Mangala and Henepola Gunaratana whom he mentored.

W. E. Perera died at the university hospital, Petaling Jaya from a massive heart attack before he was due to receive a pacemaker. Having been the first voluntary worker with the blind to have pledged his eyes earlier, his corneas were donated to the eye bank and successfully transplanted into two recipients. Following a funeral, his body was cremated and ashes dispersed in the Straits of Malacca off Klang.

Notes

References
  
 
 

1898 births
1982 deaths
Malaysian people of Sri Lankan descent
20th-century Malaysian businesspeople
Scouting and Guiding in Malaysia
Malayan people of World War II
People from Perak
People of the Malayan Emergency
History of Perak
People from British Malaya
Malaysian Buddhists
Malaysian people of Indian descent
Tamil businesspeople
Businesspeople of Indian descent
Members of the Order of the British Empire